Cookville may refer to:
Cookville, Nova Scotia, Canada
Cookville, Missouri, US
Cookville, Kansas, US
Cookville, Texas, US

See also
Cookeville (disambiguation)
Cooksville (disambiguation)